Studies in Church History is an academic journal published annually by Cambridge University Press on behalf of the Ecclesiastical History Society. It comprises papers and communications delivered at the Ecclesiastical History Society's conferences.

References

Academic journals published by learned and professional societies
Religion history journals
Publications established in 1964
Annual journals
Cambridge University Press academic journals